Wendell Hampton Ford (September 8, 1924 – January 22, 2015) was an American politician from the Commonwealth of Kentucky. He served for twenty-four years in the U.S. Senate and was the 53rd Governor of Kentucky. He was the first person to be successively elected lieutenant governor, governor and United States senator in Kentucky history. The Senate Democratic whip from 1991 to 1999, he was considered the leader of the state's Democratic Party from his election to governor in 1971 until he retired from the Senate in 1999. At the time of his retirement, he was the longest-serving senator in Kentucky's history, a mark which was then surpassed by Mitch McConnell in 2009. He is the most recent Democrat to have served as a Senator from the state of Kentucky.

Born in Daviess County, Kentucky, Ford attended the University of Kentucky, but his studies were interrupted by his service in World War II. After the war, he graduated from the Maryland School of Insurance and returned to Kentucky to help his father with the family insurance business. He also continued his military service in the Kentucky Army National Guard. He worked on the gubernatorial campaign of Bert T. Combs in 1959 and became Combs' executive assistant when Combs was elected governor. Encouraged to run for the Kentucky Senate by Combs' ally and successor, Ned Breathitt, Ford won the seat and served one four-year term before running for lieutenant governor in 1967. He was elected on a split ticket with Republican Louie B. Nunn. Four years later, Ford defeated Combs in an upset in the Democratic primary en route to the governorship.

As governor, Ford made the government more efficient by reorganizing and consolidating some departments in the executive branch. He raised revenue for the state through a severance tax on coal and enacted reforms to the educational system. He purged most of the Republicans from statewide office, including helping Walter Dee Huddleston win the Senate seat vacated by the retirement of Republican stalwart John Sherman Cooper. In 1974, Ford himself ousted the other incumbent senator, Republican Marlow Cook. Following the rapid rise of Ford and many of his political allies, he and his lieutenant governor, Julian Carroll, were investigated on charges of political corruption, but a grand jury refused to indict them. As a senator, Ford was a staunch defender of Kentucky's tobacco industry. He also formed the Senate National Guard Caucus with Missouri senator Kit Bond. Chosen as Democratic party whip in 1991, Ford considered running for floor leader in 1994 before throwing his support to Connecticut's Christopher Dodd. He retired from the Senate in 1999 and returned to Owensboro, where he taught politics to youth at the Owensboro Museum of Science and History.

Early life
Wendell Ford was born near Owensboro, in Daviess County, Kentucky, on September 8, 1924. He was the son of Ernest M. and Irene Woolfork (Schenk) Ford. His father was a state senator and ally of Kentucky Governor Earle C. Clements. Ford obtained his early education in the public schools of Daviess County and graduated from Daviess County High School. From 1942 to 1943, he attended the University of Kentucky.

On September 18, 1943, Ford married Jean Neel (1924 - living) of Owensboro at the home of the bride's parents. The couple had two children. Daughter Shirley (Ford) Dexter was born in 1950 and son Steven Ford was born in 1954. The family attended First Baptist Church in Owensboro.

In 1944, Ford left the University of Kentucky to join the army, enlisting for service in World War II on July 22, 1944. He was trained as an administrative non-commissioned officer and promoted to the rank of technical sergeant on November 17, 1945. Over the course of his service, he received the American Campaign Medal and the World War II Victory Medal and earned the Expert Infantryman Badge and Good Conduct Medal. He was honorably discharged on June 18, 1946.

Following the war, Ford returned home to work with his father in the family insurance business, and graduated from the Maryland School of Insurance in 1947. On June 7, 1949, he enlisted in the Kentucky Army National Guard and was assigned to Company I of the 149th Infantry Regimental Combat Team in Owensboro. On August 7, 1949, he was promoted to Second Lieutenant of Infantry. In 1949, Ford's company was converted from infantry to tanks, and Ford served as a Company Commander in the 240th Tank Battalion. Promoted to First Lieutenant of Armor, he transferred to the inactive Guard in 1956, before being discharged in 1962.

Political career
Ford was very active in civic affairs, becoming the first Kentuckian to serve as president of the Jaycees in 1954. He was a youth chairman of Bert T. Combs' 1959 gubernatorial campaign. After Combs' election, Ford served as Combs' executive assistant from 1959 to 1963. When his mother died in 1963, Ford returned to Owensboro to help his father with the family insurance agency. Although it was speculated he would run for lieutenant governor that year, Ford later insisted he had decided not to re-enter politics until Governor Ned Breathitt asked him to run against Casper "Cap" Gardner, the state senate's majority leader and a major obstacle to Breathitt's progressive legislative agenda. Ford won the 1965 election by only 305 votes but quickly became a key player in the state senate. Representing the Eighth District, including Daviess and Hancock counties, Ford introduced 22 major pieces of legislation that became law during his single term in the senate.

In 1967, Ford ran for lieutenant governor, this time against the wishes of Breathitt and Combs, whose pick was state attorney general Robert Matthews. Ford defeated Matthews by 631 votes, 0.2% of the total vote count in the primary. He ran an independent campaign and won in the general election even as Combs-Breathitt pick Henry Ward lost the race for governor to Republican Louie B. Nunn. Republicans and Democrats split the state offices, with five going to Republicans and four going to Democrats.

During his time as lieutenant governor, Ford rebuilt the state's Democratic machine, which would help elect him and others, including Senator Walter Huddleston and Governor Martha Layne Collins. When Governor Nunn asked the legislature to increase the state sales tax in 1968 from 3 percent to 5 percent, Ford opposed the measure, saying it should only pass if food and medicine were exempted. Ford lost this battle; the increase passed without exemptions. From 1970 to 1971, Ford was a member of the Executive Committee of the National Conference of Lieutenant Governors. While lieutenant governor, he became an honorary member of  Lambda Chi Alpha Fraternity in 1969.

Governor of Kentucky
At the expiration of his term as lieutenant governor, Ford was one of eight candidates to enter the 1971 Democratic gubernatorial primary. The favorite of the field was Ford's mentor, Combs. During the campaign, Ford attacked Combs' age and the sales tax enacted during Combs' administration. He also questioned why Combs would leave his better-paying federal judgeship to run for a second term as governor. Ford garnered more votes than Combs and the other six candidates combined, and attributed his unlikely win over Combs in the primary to superior strategy and Combs' underestimation of his candidacy. Following the election, Combs correctly predicted "This is the end of the road for me politically."

Ford went on to win the governorship in a four-way general election that included another former Democratic governor, A. B. "Happy" Chandler, who ran as an independent. Ford finished more than 58,000 votes ahead of his closest rival, Republican Tom Emberton. With Combs and Chandler both out of politics, factionalism in the Kentucky Democratic Party began to wane.

As governor, Ford raised revenue from a severance tax on coal, a two-cent-per-gallon tax on gasoline, and an increased corporate tax. He balanced these increases by exempting food from the state sales tax. The resulting large budget surplus allowed him to propose several construction projects. His victory in the primary had been largely due to Jefferson County, and he returned the favor by approving funds to build the Commonwealth Convention Center and expand the Kentucky Fair and Exposition Center. He also shepherded a package of reforms to the state's criminal justice system through the first legislative session of his term.

Ford oversaw the transition of the University of Louisville from municipal to state funding. He pushed for reforms to the state's education system, giving up his own chairmanship of the University of Kentucky board of trustees and extending voting rights to student and faculty members of university boards. These changes generally shifted administration positions in the state's colleges from political rewards to professional appointments. He increased funding to the state's education budget and gave expanded powers to the Council on Higher Education. He vetoed a measure that would have allowed collective bargaining for teachers.

Ford drew praise for his attention to the mundane task of improving the efficiency and organization of executive departments, creating several "super cabinets" under which many departments were consolidated. During the 1972 legislative session, he created the Department of Finance and Administration, combining the functions of the Kentucky Program Development Office and the Department of Finance. Constitutional limits sometimes prevented him from combining like functions, but Ford made the reorganization a top priority and realized some savings to the state.

On March 21, 1972, the U.S. Supreme Court handed down its ruling in the case of Dunn v. Blumstein that found that a citizen who had lived in a state for 30 days was resident in that state and thus eligible to vote there. Kentucky's Constitution required residency of one year in the state, six months in the county and sixty days in the precinct to establish voting eligibility. This issue had to be resolved before the 1972 presidential election in November, so Ford called a special legislative session to enact the necessary corrections. In addition, Ford added to the General Assembly's agenda the creation of a state environmental protection agency, a refinement of congressional districts in line with the latest census figures and ratification of the recently passed Equal Rights Amendment. All of these measures passed.

Despite surgery for a brain aneurysm in June 1972, Ford attended the 1972 Democratic National Convention in Miami Beach, Florida. He supported Edmund Muskie for president, but later greeted nominee George McGovern when he visited Kentucky. The convention was the beginning of Ford's role in national politics. Offended by the McGovern campaign's treatment of Democratic finance chairman Robert Schwarz Strauss, he helped Strauss get elected chairman of the Democratic National Committee following McGovern's defeat. As a result of his involvement in Strauss' election, Ford was elected chair of the Democratic Governors' Conference from 1973 to 1974. He also served as vice-chair of the Conference's Natural Resources and Environmental Management Committee.

During the 1974 legislative session, Ford proposed a six-year study of coal liquefaction and gasification in response to the 1973 oil crisis. He also increased funding to human resources and continued his reorganization of the executive branch, creating cabinets for transportation, development, education and the arts, human resources, consumer protection and regulation, safety and justice. He was considered less ruthless than previous governors in firing state officials hired by the previous administration, and expanded the state merit system to cover some previously exempt state workers. Despite the expansion, he was criticized for the replacements he made, particularly that of the state personnel commissioner appointed during the Nunn administration. Critics also cited the fact that employees found qualified by the merit examination were still required to obtain political clearance before they were hired.

Ford united the state's Democratic Party, allowing them to capture a seat in the U.S. Senate in 1972 for the first time since 1956. The seat was vacated by the retirement of Republican John Sherman Cooper and won by Ford's campaign manager, Walter Dee Huddleston. Ford's friends then began lobbying him to try and unseat Kentucky's other Republican senator, one-term legislator Marlow Cook. Ford wanted lieutenant governor Julian Carroll, who had run on an informal slate with Combs in the 1971 primary, to run for Cook's seat, but Carroll already had his eye on the governor's chair. Ford's allies did not have a gubernatorial candidate stronger than Carroll, and when a poll showed that Ford was the only Democrat who could defeat Cook, he agreed to run, announcing his candidacy immediately following the 1974 legislative session.

A primary issue during the election was the construction of a dam on the Red River. Cook opposed the dam, but Ford supported it and allocated some of the state's budget surplus to its construction. In the election, Ford defeated Cook by a vote of 399,406 to 328,982, completing his revitalization of the state's Democratic party by personally ousting the last Republican from major office. Cook resigned his seat in December so that Ford would have a higher standing in seniority in the Senate. Ford resigned as governor to accept the seat, leaving the governorship to Carroll, who dropped state support for the project, killing it.

In the wake of the rapid ascent of Ford and members of his faction to the state's major political offices, he and Carroll were investigated in a corruption probe. The four-year investigation began in 1977 and focused on a state insurance kickback scheme alleged to have operated during Ford's tenure. In June 1972, Ford had purchased insurance policies for state workers from some of his political backers without competitive bidding. State law did not require competitive bidding, and earlier governors had engaged in similar practices. Investigators believed there was an arrangement in which insurance companies getting government contracts split commissions with party officials, although Ford was suspected of allowing the practice for political benefit rather than personal financial gain. In 1981, prosecutors asked for indictments against Ford and Carroll on racketeering charges but a grand jury refused. Because grand jury proceedings are secret, what exactly occurred has never been publicly revealed. However, state Republicans maintained that Ford took the Fifth Amendment while on the stand, invoking his right against self-incrimination. Ford refused to confirm or deny this report. A federal grand jury recommended that Ford be indicted in connection with the insurance scheme, but the U.S. Department of Justice did not act on this recommendation.

United States Senate
Ford entered the Senate in 1974 and was reelected in 1980, 1986 and 1992. In the 1980 primary, Ford received only token opposition from attorney Flora Stuart. He was unopposed in the 1986 and 1992 Democratic primaries. Republicans failed to put forward a viable challenger during any of Ford's re-election bids. In 1980, he defeated septuagenarian former state auditor Mary Louise Foust by 334,862 votes. Ford's 720,891 votes represented 65 percent of the total votes cast in the election, a record for a statewide race in Kentucky. Against Republican Jackson Andrews IV in 1986, Ford shattered that record, securing 74 percent of the votes cast and carrying all 120 Kentucky counties. State senator David L. Williams fared little better in 1992, surrendering 477,002 votes to Ford (63 percent).

Ford seriously considered leaving the Senate and running for governor again in 1983 and 1991, but decided against it both times. In the 1983 contest, he would have faced sitting lieutenant governor Martha Layne Collins in the primary. Collins was a factional ally of Ford's, which influenced his decision. In 1991, Ford cited his seniority in the Senate and desire to become Democratic Senate whip as factors in his decision not to run for governor.

Early in his career, Ford supported a constitutional amendment against desegregation busing. He also floated a proposal to put the federal budget on a two-year cycle, believing too much time was spent annually on budget wrangling. This idea, based on the model used in the Kentucky state budget, was never implemented. During the Ninety-fifth Congress (1977–1979), he was chairman of the Committee on Aeronautical and Space Sciences.

From 1977 to 1983, Ford was a member of the Democratic Senatorial Campaign Committee. He first sought the post of Democratic whip in 1988, but lost to California's Alan Cranston, who had held the post since 1977. Ford got a late start in the race, and a New York Times writer opined that he overestimated his chances of unseating Cranston. Immediately after conceding his loss, he announced he would be a candidate for the position in the next election in 1990. He again faced Cranston in the election, but Cranston withdrew from the race due to a battle with prostate cancer. Ford maintained that he had enough commitments of support in the Democratic caucus to have won without Cranston's withdrawal. When majority leader George J. Mitchell retired from the Senate in 1994, Ford showed some interest in the Democratic floor leader post. Ultimately, he decided against it, choosing to focus instead on Kentucky issues. He supported Christopher Dodd for majority leader.

During the Ninety-eighth Congress (1983–1985), Ford served on the Select Committee to Study the Committee System, and he was a member of the Committee on Rules and Administration in the One Hundredth through One Hundred Third Congresses (1987–1995). In 1989, he joined with Missouri senator Kit Bond to form the Senate National Guard Caucus, a coalition of senators committed to advancing National Guard capabilities and readiness. Ford said he was motivated to form the caucus after seeing the work done by Mississippi Representative Sonny Montgomery with the National Guard Association and the National Guard Bureau. Ford co-chaired the caucus with Bond until Ford's retirement from the Senate in 1999. The Kentucky Army Guard dedicated the Wendell H. Ford Training Center in Muhlenberg County, Kentucky in 1998. In 1999, the National Guard Bureau presented Ford with the Sonny Montgomery Award, its highest honor.

Missouri senator Thomas Eagleton opined that Ford and Dee Huddleston made "probably the best one-two combination for any state in the Senate." Both were defenders of tobacco, Kentucky's primary cash crop. Ford sat on the Commerce Committee, influencing legislation affecting the manufacturing end of the tobacco industry, while Huddleston sat on the Agriculture Committee and protected programs that benefited tobacco farmers. Both were instrumental in salvaging the Tobacco Price Support Program. Ford got tobacco exempted from the Consumer Product Safety Act and was a consistent opponent of cigarette tax increases. He sponsored an amendment to the General Agreement on Tariffs and Trade that limited the amount of foreign tobacco that could be imported by the United States.

Later in his career, Ford split with Huddleston's successor, Mitch McConnell, over a proposed settlement of lawsuits against tobacco companies. Ford favored the package as presented to Congress, which would have protected the price support program, while McConnell favored a smaller aid package to tobacco farmers and an end to the price support program. Both proposals were ultimately defeated, and the rift between Ford and McConnell never healed.

As chairman of the Commerce Committee's aviation subcommittee, Ford secured funds to improve the airports in Louisville, northern Kentucky, and Glasgow. The Wendell H. Ford Airport in Hazard, Kentucky is named for him. A 1990 bill aimed at reducing aircraft noise, improving airline safety measures, and requiring airlines to better inform consumers about their performance was dubbed the Wendell H. Ford Aviation Investment and Reform Act for the 21st Century.

Of his career in the Senate, Ford said "I wasn't interested in national issues. I was interested in Kentucky issues." Nevertheless, he influenced several important pieces of federal legislation. He sponsored an amendment to the Family Medical Leave Act exempting businesses with fewer than fifty employees. He was a key player in securing passage of the motor voter law in 1993. He supported increases to the federal minimum wage and a 1996 welfare reform bill. A supporter of research into clean coal technology, he also worked with West Virginia senator Jay Rockefeller to secure better retirement benefits for coal miners. Never known as a major player on international issues, Ford favored continued economic sanctions against Iraq as an alternative to the Gulf War. He voted against the Panama Canal Treaty, which he perceived to be unpopular with Kentucky voters. Despite having chaired Bill Clinton's inaugural committee in 1993, Ford broke with the administration by voting against the North American Free Trade Agreement .

As he had as governor of Kentucky, Ford gave attention to improving the efficiency of government. While serving on the Joint Committee on Printing during the One Hundred First and One Hundred Third Congresses, he saved the government millions of dollars in printing costs by printing in volume and using recycled paper. In 1998, Virginia senator John Warner sponsored the Wendell H. Ford Government Publications Reform Act of 1998; Ford signed on as a co-sponsor. The bill would have eliminated the Joint Committee on Printing, distributing its authority and functions among the Senate Rules Committee, the House Oversight Committee, and the administrator of the Government Printing Office. It would also have centralized government printing services and penalized government agencies who did not make their documents available to the printing office to be printed. Opponents of the bill cited the broad powers granted to the printing office and concerns about the erosion of copyright protection. The bill was reported favorably out of committee, but was squeezed from the legislative calendar by issues related to the impending impeachment of Bill Clinton. Warner did not return to his chairmanship of the Joint Committee on Printing in the next congress, Ford retired from the Senate, and the bill was not re-introduced.

Later life
Ford chose not to seek a fifth term in 1998, and retired to Owensboro. In 1998 he was named an Honorary Member of the American Library Association. He worked for a time as a consultant to Washington lobbying and law firm Dickstein Shapiro Morin & Oshinsky. At the time of his retirement, Ford was the longest-serving senator in Kentucky history. In January 2009, Mitch McConnell surpassed Ford's mark of 24 years in the Senate.

In August 1978, the US 60 bypass around Owensboro was renamed the Wendell H. Ford Expressway. The Western Kentucky Parkway was also renamed the Wendell H. Ford Western Kentucky Parkway during the administration of Governor Paul E. Patton. In 2009, Ford was inducted into the Kentucky Transportation Hall of Fame.

Later in life, Ford taught politics to the youth of Owensboro from the Owensboro Museum of Science and History, which houses a replica of his Senate office. On July 19, 2014, the Messenger-Inquirer reported that Ford had been diagnosed with lung cancer.

Ford died at his home on January 22, 2015, at the age of 90 from lung cancer, and was buried at Rosehill Elmwood Cemetery.

See also
 Conservative Democrat

References

Bibliography

External links

|-

|-

|-

|-

|-

|-

|-

|-

|-

|-

|-

|-

|-

|-

1924 births
2015 deaths
United States Army personnel of World War II
Baptists from Kentucky
Deaths from lung cancer in Kentucky
Democratic Party governors of Kentucky
Democratic Party United States senators from Kentucky
Democratic Party Kentucky state senators
Lieutenant Governors of Kentucky
Politicians from Owensboro, Kentucky
United States Army officers
20th-century Baptists
Kentucky National Guard personnel
National Guard (United States) officers
20th-century American politicians